Phetjee Jaa Or.Meekun (เพชรจีจ้า อ.มีคุณ; born December 31, 2001) is a Thai professional boxer and Muay Thai fighter.

In Muay Thai, she has won world titles under the WPMF and WMC banners. In boxing, she has won a bronze medal at the 2021 SEA Games.

Background
PhetJee Jaa started Muay Thai at the age of 7 with her uncles. She rapidly became known in the provinces of Thailand as the girl who could defeat boys, at the age of 10 she had over 100 fights, more than 70 of them against boys.

In 2013 PhetJee Jaa was stopped from competing against boys due to the laws of Thailand as her fights were starting to get televised. Having to compete only against women she is outweighed by most of her opponents.

In 2018 she joined the Thai national boxing team with the hope of qualifying for the Tokyo Olympics.

She made her professional boxing debut on August 3, 2022.

Titles and accomplishments

Muay Thai
World Professional Muaythai Federation
 2017 WPMF World 105 lbs Champion 
World Muay Thai Council
 2016 WMC World -45 kg Champion 
THAI FIGHT
 2021 THAI FIGHT Queen’s Cup -51 kg Champion

Amateur boxing
 2018 AIBA Women's Youth World Championships 48kg 
 2018 ASBC Asian Confederation Youth Championships 
 2019 Golden Girl Box Cup 48 kg  & Best Boxer of the competition 
 2021 SEA Games Women's 51 kg

Professional boxing record

Muay Thai record

|-  style="background:#cfc" 
| 2023-03-17|| Win ||align=left| Fani Peloumpi ||  ONE Friday Fights 9, Lumpinee Stadium || Bangkok, Thailand || TKO (punch to the body) || 2 || 1:38
|- style="background:#cfc;"
| 2021-12-19 || Win ||align=left| Rungnapa Por.Muengphet || THAI FIGHT Khao Aor, Queen’s Cup Flyweight tournament - Final || Phatthalung, Thailand || KO (Punches) || 2 ||
|-
! style=background:white colspan=9 |
|- style="background:#cfc;"
| 2021-07-04 ||Win||align=left| Cindy Silvestre || THAI FIGHT Strong, Queen’s Cup Flyweight tournament - Semifinal || Pattaya, Thailand || KO (Punches) || 2 ||
|- style="background:#cfc;"
| 2021-04-03|| Win || align="left" | Aida Looksaikongdin || Thai Fight Nan || Nan province, Thailand || KO (Spinning back fist)  || 3 ||
|- style="background:#cfc;"
| 2020-11-28|| Win || align="left" | Mariana Bernardes || Thai Fight Pluak Daeng || Rayong, Thailand || TKO (Elbows)  || 2 ||
|- style="background:#cfc;"
| 2020-11-07|| Win || align="left" | Morgane Manfredi|| Thai Fight Korat 2020 || Nakhon Ratchasima, Thailand || TKO (Doctor Stoppage) || 2 ||   3:00
|- style="background:#cfc;"
| 2020-10-17|| Win || align="left" | Barbara Aguiar || Thai Fight Begins || Nonthaburi, Thailand || Decision || 3 || 3:00
|- style="background:#cfc;"
| 2020-09-19|| Win || align="left" | Celest Hansen || Thai Fight: New Normal|| Bangkok, Thailand || TKO (Doctor Stoppage) || 1 ||
|-  style="background:#cfc;"
| 2018-01-27|| Win ||align=left| Calista Parts || THAI FIGHT Bangkok 2017 || Bangkok, Thailand || TKO (Punches) || 1 ||
|-  style="background:#fbb;"
| 2017-11-22|| Loss||align=left| MIO || Shoot Boxing GROUND ZERO TOKYO 2017 || Tokyo, Japan || Decision (Unanimous) || 3 || 3:00
|-  bgcolor="#cfc"
| 2017-|| Win ||align=left|  ||  ||  China || Decision ||  ||
|-  bgcolor="#cfc"
| 2017-06-08|| Win ||align=left| Sandra Godvik || Women's Muay Thai World Championships 2017 || Bangkok, Thailand || Decision || 3 || 2:00
|-  bgcolor="#cfc"
| 2017-04-01|| Win ||align=left| Phetnaree Chor.Phetchorajan || WPMF Muay Thai || Bangkok, Thailand || Decision || 5 || 2:00
|-
! style=background:white colspan=9 |
|-  bgcolor="#cfc"
| 2016-07-30|| Win ||align=left| Penphet Sor.Thianchai || Women's Muay Thai World Championships 2016 || Bangkok, Thailand || Decision || 5 || 2:00
|-
! style=background:white colspan=9 |
|-  bgcolor="#cfc"
| 2016-07-09|| Win ||align=left| Rungnapa Por.Muangphet || PPTV Muay Thai Fight Night || Bangkok, Thailand || Decision || 3 || 2:00
|-  bgcolor="#fbb"
| 2016-02-07|| Loss ||align=left| Manazo Kobayashi || MuayThaiOpen 34|| Tokyo, Japan || Decision (Majority) ||5 || 2:00
|-  bgcolor="#cfc"
| 2015-12-27|| Win ||align=left| Faa Chiangrai Sor.Sakonthom || Aswindum || Bangkok, Thailand || Decision || 5 || 2:00
|-  bgcolor="#cfc"
| 2015-08-31|| Win ||align=left|  || || Nakhon Ratchasima, Thailand || KO  ||3 ||
|-  bgcolor="#cfc"
| 2015-08-12|| Win ||align=left| Phettae Or. Wanchert || Queen's Birthday || Bangkok, Thailand || Decision || 5 || 2:00
|-  bgcolor="#cfc"
| 2015-07-26|| Win ||align=left| Nongjoy Sor.Sommai || Aswindum || Bangkok, Thailand || Decision || 5 || 2:00
|-  bgcolor="#cfc"
| 2015-06-04|| Win ||align=left| Augnkor Soonkelabampoo|| PPTV Muay Thai Fight Night || Bangkok, Thailand || KO (Knees) || 2 ||
|-  bgcolor="#cfc"
| 2015-|| Win ||align=left| Kutawan Sor.Sommai || Aswindum || Bangkok, Thailand || TKO (Referee Stoppage) || 2 ||
|-  bgcolor="#cfc"
| 2015-05-18|| Win ||align=left| Lookget Payalampong || Thepprasit Stadium || Pattaya, Thailand || TKO (Ref. Stoppage/Kicks)|| 4 ||
|-  bgcolor="#cfc"
| 2015-02-15|| Win ||align=left| Buakaw Lokboonmee || || Nakhon Ratchasima, Thailand || Decision ||5 || 2:00
|-  bgcolor="#cfc"
| 2014-11-18|| Win ||align=left| Dong-eh Lunjaaprayaa || || Si Racha, Thailand || KO (Knee to the head) ||2 ||
|-  bgcolor="#cfc"
| 2014-11-06|| Win ||align=left| Nongbrai Gogiathuawaa || || Prachinburi Province, Thailand || KO (Knees) ||3 ||
|-  bgcolor="#cfc"
| 2014-07-26|| Win ||align=left| Inseedam Poptheeratham || || Bangkok, Thailand || Decision ||5 || 2:00
|-
! style=background:white colspan=9 |
|-
| colspan=9 | Legend:

References

Phetjee Jaa Or.Meekun
Phetjee Jaa Or.Meekun
Living people
2001 births
Phetjee Jaa Or.Meekun
Competitors at the 2021 Southeast Asian Games
Phetjee Jaa Or.Meekun
Southeast Asian Games medalists in boxing